Nihal may refer to:

Nihal (name), people with the name
Beta Leporis, a star traditionally known as Nihal
Nihāl, a tribe that inhabits parts of Central India; cf. Nihali language
Nihal the hero of the fantasy saga by Licia Troisi Le Cronache del mondo emerso